Karen Manvelyan is an Armenian biologist and environmentalist who has worked in San Francisco as a scientist for much of his life. He is the current director of the World Wildlife Fund in Armenia.

References

External links
 World Wildlife Foundation profile

Living people
Armenian biologists
Year of birth missing (living people)